Jong Chun-mi (born March 15, 1985) is a female North Korean weightlifter who competes in the -58 kg division.  She finished 6th at the 2012 Summer Olympics.

References

External links
the-sports.org

1985 births
Living people
North Korean female weightlifters
Olympic weightlifters of North Korea
Weightlifters at the 2012 Summer Olympics
Asian Games medalists in weightlifting
World Weightlifting Championships medalists
Weightlifters at the 2010 Asian Games
Asian Games bronze medalists for North Korea
Medalists at the 2010 Asian Games
20th-century North Korean women
21st-century North Korean women